Garzón vive is a Colombian telenovela that premiered on RCN Televisión on 15 January 2018 and ended on 1 June 2018. Created by Juan Carlos Pérez, based on the life of the Colombian comedian, politician and journalist Jaime Garzón. It stars Santiago Alarcón as the titular character.

This TV series does not have the approval of the Garzón family, which, led by María Soledad 'Marisol', defender of her brother's legacy, announced lawsuits against RCN for misrepresenting her brother's story.

Cast 
 Santiago Alarcón as Jaime Garzón
 Sebastián Gutierrez as Young Jaime
 Darío Cifuentes as Child Jaime
 Zharick León as Yolanda
 Diana Belmonte as Cravis
 Alberto León Jaramillo
 Jacques Touckmanian as Mariano Garzón
 Carmenza González as Graciela de Garzón
 Cecilia Navia as Soledad Cifuentes
 Laura Rodríguez as Matsy
 Diana Wiswell as Julia Garzón Adulta
 Katherine Velez as Gabriela Másmela de Cifuentes †
 Natalia Jerez as Maribel Sánchez
 Mario Ruiz as Alejandro Cortez
 Carlos Camacho as Santiago Villegas
 Julio Escallón as El Negro
 Jacques Toukhmanian as Alfredo Garzón
 María José Vargas Agudelo as Natasha Fonseca
 Santiago Rodríguez as Mauricio Vargas
 Nicolás Montero as Camilo Caballero
 Matías Maldonado as Bernardo Ortega Hoyos
 Carolina Cuervo as Lucy
 Viviana Sandoval as Shifon
 Fernando Rojas as Nestor Morales
 Germán Escallón as Padre Cuervo
 Carlos Hurtado as Tobías Garzón
 Luis Fernando Hoyos as Jorge Arenas
 Laura Perico as Tatiana Sáenz Santamaría
 Silvia de Dios as Elvira
 Mauricio Iragorri as Gerente
 Jorge López as Jorge Consuegra
 Mabel Moreno as Angela del Valle
 Rodolfo Silva as Comandante Angarita
 Waldo Urrego as Francisco Rueda
 Margarita Rosa de Francisco as Claudia de Francisco
 Carlos Andrés Ramírez as Tulio

References 

2018 telenovelas
Colombian telenovelas
RCN Televisión telenovelas
Spanish-language television shows
2018 Colombian television series debuts
2018 Colombian television series endings
Television shows set in Bogotá